The 2004 Porsche Michelin Supercup season was the 12th Porsche Supercup season. The races were all supporting races in the 2004 Formula One season. It travelled to ten circuits across Europe and a double-header at Indianapolis, USA. It was the last season that the 996 model was raced. It was replaced with the 997 model in 2005.

Teams and drivers

Race calendar and results

Championship standings

† — Drivers did not finish the race, but were classified as they completed over 90% of the race distance.

References

External links
The Porsche Mobil 1 Supercup website
Porsche Mobil 1 Supercup Online Magazine

Porsche Supercup seasons
Porsche Supercup